Rockport is an unincorporated community in Allen County, in the U.S. state of Ohio.

History
Rockport was platted in 1836. The post office at Rockport was called Cranberry. This post office was established in 1849, and remained in operation until 1901.

References

Unincorporated communities in Allen County, Ohio
1836 establishments in Ohio
Populated places established in 1836
Unincorporated communities in Ohio